Unknown Man #89  is a crime novel written by Elmore Leonard, published in 1977, just after his novel Swag, and preceding The Hunted. It is a sequel to The Big Bounce.

Plot summary
Detroit process server Jack Ryan has a reputation for finding men who don't want to be found. A string of seemingly unrelated crimes leads Ryan to the search for a missing stockholder known only as "unknown man #89," but his missing man isn't "unknown" to everyone: a pretty blonde hates his guts, and a very nasty dude named Virgil Royal wants him dead in the worst way. This is very unfortunate for Jack, who is suddenly caught in the crossfire of a lethal triple-cross and becomes as much a target as his nameless prey. Along the way, Ryan butts heads with local police, including six-shooter-carrying Dick Speed. The book is perhaps best remembered for a sequence taken straight from The Godfather, where thug Virgil plants a shotgun in the meeting place of his victim, in this case, the fire escape of Bobby Lear's hotel room. Also of note is homosexual wannabe gangster Lonnie, whose "superfly" haircut was emulated by several of Elmore Leonard's other characters.

Characters in Unknown Man #89
Jack Ryan – Detroit process server
Virgil Royal – nasty dude
Tunafish – Associate of Virgil Royal
Dick Speed – local police officer
Jay Walt – Collection Agency Manager
Denise Leary – Wife of Robert Leary, Jr. 
Mr. Perez – Businessman
Raymond Gidre – Assistant to Mr. Perez

Notes
According to the revised edition of "Hitchcock" by François Truffaut, Alfred Hitchcock was seriously considering adapting Leonard's novel Unknown Man No. 89, to which he had acquired the rights, as his follow-up film to Family Plot (1976), his 53rd and final project. He abandoned that idea and considered some other novels, but in 1978 Hitchcock closed his offices and dismissed his staff. There never was a 54th film. In 1980 Hitchcock died.

External links
Unknown Man#89 at Elmore Leonard.com

1977 American novels
American crime novels
Novels by Elmore Leonard
Novels set in Detroit